Lamachaur (Nepali: लामाचौर) is name of place located in both ward number 16 & 19 of Pokhara Metropolitan City, Nepal. It is a residential area.

Origin of the name 
Lama means Long and Chaur means Ground.

Educations 
There are several governmental and private institutions in Lamachaur:
 IOE Paschimanchal Campus
 Indra Rajya Laxmi school
 Gandaki Boarding School
 Saraswati Adarsha Vidyashram

Transportation 
Privately run public transport system operating throughout the city, adjoining townships and nearby villages. Pokhara Mahanagar Bus (green, brown and blue buses), Bindabashini Samiti(blue buses), Lekhnath Bus Bebasaya Samiti ( green and white buses) and Phewa Bus Bebasaya Samiti(mini micros) are public buses available in city. The public transport mainly consists of local and city buses, micros, micro-buses and metered-taxis.

Communication 
List of several Internet Service Providers(ISP) in Lamachaur are:

 Worldlink
 Nepal Telecom
 Vianet
 Classic Tech

References

Neighbourhoods in Pokhara